Hazard is a 1980 role-playing game supplement for Superhero: 2044 published by Judges Guild.

Plot summary
Hazard is a map of the Pacific area around Superhero 2044'''s Inguria Island, from China and Japan in the north, the Indonesian islands in the west, the southwest coast of North America and a new subcontinent in the east to Australia in the south.

Reception
William A. Barton reviewed Hazard in The Space Gamer No. 48. Barton commented that "those of you who haven't given up on Superhero 2044 for other, more playable, superhero role-playing systems will find much of interest and use in Hazard''."

References

Judges Guild publications
Role-playing game supplements introduced in 1980
Superhero role-playing game supplements